Personal loans  in Japan are provided by three types of providers. First, there are large, traditional banks, with a long history. Their big advantage is the availability of loans and branches of these banks. Loans are also provided by specialized consumer credit companies. These are often owned by large, multi-national corporation. For example, Acom, one of leading consumer credit companies in Japan, is owned by Mitsubishi UFJ Financial Group. The advantage of these loans is their availability when these companies are willing to serve customers who do not have a bank loan. A big role is played by psychology, when many people feel shame when they go to apply for a loan to the bank and often needs a guarantor.

On the Japanese market, there are companies that operate at so-called gray zone, sometimes called sarakin. According to estimations, about 10% of the population borrowed from them and there are about 10,000 companies like that on Japanese market. Interest rates were as high as 29.2%.  This rate was capped to 15-20% p.a.

On Japanese market, it is not as common to work with credit score as with western markets. Every company and bank uses its own credit rating model without any help of credit bureau.

Many regional banks are facing several obstacles – high risk-aversion in Japanese population in general. Secondly, the competition is increasing on the market and legal framework is getting stricter. Finally, many young people are moving to big cities, where they are handled by big banks. This led to the merger of the Bank of Yokohama and Higashi-Nippon Bank.

Last and most recent platform, is P2P lending. There are only few operators in Japan running this platform so this kind of distribution channel is still minor.

List of top 15 biggest retail banks in Japan

List of biggest consumer credit companies
 Acom - currently a market leader with 713 billion yen in outstanding unsecured loans to consumers 
 Aiful - with 216 billion yen in outstanding unsecured loans to consumers 
 Takefuji
 Sumitomo Mitsui Banking Corporation - (formerly Promise Co.) – with market name Mobit - with 181 billion yen in outstanding unsecured loans to consumers

List of biggest P2P platforms

 maneo, Inc. - the first P2P platform in Japan, established in 2007. It started as a consumer loan provider, bud changed its focus on SME soon. It focused on customer-credit and extended product variety to real-estate collateralized loans. 
 AQUSH - second P2P platform in Japan, established in 2009
 SBI Social Lending Co – established in 2008, launched in 2011. This platform focused on collateralized loans too.
 Crowdfunding, Inc.., announced in 2013

Loan demand 

Demand for loans in Japan is rising again. After a drop in 2010 and 2011 slow recovery become visible again. Concerning year 2014, demand grew slightly especially due to auto loan demand, which driven positive performance of entire market. Performance in first four months of 2014 year was driven by VAT increase that made a high demand for expensive items in order to save taxes.

In June 2015, banking lending grew by 2.6%. Key drivers were regional banks, with growth 3.8% comparing to the same month last year. Major banks grew by 1.2%.

Key product on Japanese market are still credit cards with current boom of contactless payments that allows faster processing of every payment at POS terminal. This trend moves cash payments to card/contactless payments. Nevertheless, Japanese attitude is stable – risk-averse. Japanese are using their credit cards often as free riders – repaying their balance at the end of the month.

The 2010 Money Lending Business Act 
 
Due to this act, many small companies on the edge of the market went to bankruptcy. Many other were sold according to decreasing profitability of the business. For example, GE was selling Lake, their consumer-credit division.

See also
 List of banks in Japan
 Economy of Japan
 Loan
 Interest

References

Loans
Banking in Japan